Beauvue is an unincorporated community in St. Mary's County, Maryland, United States. Mulberry Fields was listed on the National Register of Historic Places in 1973.

References

Unincorporated communities in St. Mary's County, Maryland
Unincorporated communities in Maryland